John Denis Charmley  (born 9 November 1955) is a British academic and diplomatic historian.  Since 2002 he has held various posts at the University of East Anglia: initially as Head of the School of History, then as the Head of the School of Music and most recently as the Head of the Institute for Interdisciplinary Humanities. Since 2016 he has been Pro-Vice Chancellor for Academic strategy at St Mary's University, Twickenham. In this role he has been responsible for initiating the University's Foundation Year Programme, reflecting Professor Charmley's commitment to widening educational access.

Education

He was educated at Rock Ferry High School and Pembroke College, Oxford (BA, 1977; DPhil, 1982).

Views
Charmley sums up his feelings about Winston Churchill in Churchill: The End of Glory:

Churchill stood for the British Empire, for British independence and for an 'anti-Socialist' vision of Britain. By July 1945 the first of these was on the skids, the second was dependent solely upon America and the third had just vanished in a Labour election victory.

Charmley has also tried to rehabilitate Neville Chamberlain.  F. M. Leventhal, in a review of Chamberlain and the Lost Peace, suggested that while Charmley's work portrayed a courageous leader with "a deep and humane desire to leave no stone unturned to avoid war," Chamberlain's inability to recognise Hitler's ambition meant that "perhaps that is why Winston Churchill's reputation remains largely untarnished, while Chamberlain's, Charmley's initiative notwithstanding, cannot be resuscitated".

Criticism
Some historians argue that it is difficult to blame the fall of the British Empire on Churchill, as it was exceedingly likely to fall anyway. Scholars also find the idea of a truce with Germany unwise at best, as Richard M. Langworth wrote:

Every serious military account of the Second World War shows that Germany came within a hair of taking Russia out even as it was. With no enemy at his back, tying up materiel and divisions in the West; without Britain's campaign in Africa; without the Americans and British succoring Stalin by sea; without Roosevelt's courting war with Germany in the Atlantic, Hitler would have thrown everything he had into Russia. The siege of Leningrad, the attack on Moscow, the battle of Stalingrad would almost certainly have gone the other way, if not in 1941 then certainly by 1942.

A more general critique of the idea of making peace with Germany comes from Manfred Weidhorn:

Prudential (albeit immoral) as that solution might have been, the critics assume that (1) Hitler would deal; (2) the British Coalition government would let Churchill deal; (3) Hitler would be faithful to the deal; (4) Russia would have gone under; (5) America would keep out; (6) The British Empire still had a long way to go; (7) a Britain tied to Hitler would have remained democratic; (8) American hegemony is bad. As Langworth, Smith, et al. point out, most of these Charmley assumptions (1–3, 6–8) are dubious.

Military historian Correlli Barnett calls it "absurd ... that instead of going to war Britain could, and should, have lived with Wilhelmine Germany's domination of western Europe. This is glibly clever but actually preposterous as his claim ... that Britain could and should have unilaterally withdrawn into neutrality in 1940–41"

Books
 John Charmley, Duff Cooper (Weidenfeld, 1986). .
 John Charmley, Lord Lloyd and the Decline of the British Empire (Weidenfeld, 1987). .
 John Charmley, Chamberlain and the Lost Peace (Hodder and Stroughton, 1989). .
 John Charmley, Churchill: The End of Glory (Hodder and Stroughton, 1993). .
 John Charmley, Churchill's Grand Alliance 1940–1957 (Hodder and Stoughton, 1995). .
 John Charmley, A History of Conservative Politics 1900–1996 (MacMillan, 1996). .
 John Charmley, Splendid Isolation?: Britain and the Balance of Power 1874–1914 (Hodder and Stroughton, 1999). .
 John Charmley, "Chamberlain, Churchill and the End of Empire" in The Decline of Empires. (Wein, 2001). .
 John Charmley, "Palmerston: Artful Old Dodger or Babe of Grace?" in The Makers of British Foreign Policy from Pitt to Thatcher. (Palgrave Macmillan, 2002). .
 John Charmley, "What if Halifax Had Become Prime Minister in 1940?" in Prime Minister Portillo and Other Things that Never Happened: A Collection of Political Counterfactuals. (Portico's, 2003). .
 John Charmley, "From Splendid Isolation to Finest Hour: Britain as a Global Power, 1900–1950" in The Foreign Office and British Diplomacy in the Twentieth Century (Routledge, 2005). .
 John Charmley, The Princess and the Politicians: Sex, Intrigue and Diplomacy, 1812–40 (Viking, 2005). .
 John Charmley, A History of Conservative Politics since 1830. (Palgrave Macmillan, 2008). .
 John Charmley, "Unravelling Silk: Princess Lieven, Metternich and Castlereagh" in A Living Anachronism? European Diplomacy and the Habsburg Monarchy. (Bohlau: Vienna, 2010). pp. 15–29. .
 John Charmley, "Neville Chamberlain and the Consequences of the Churchillian Hegemony" in Origins of the Second World War: An International Perspective. (Continuum, 2011). p. 448. .

References

External links
 brief profile from the University of East Anglia

1955 births
Living people
Alumni of Pembroke College, Oxford
Academics of the University of East Anglia
Fellows of the Royal Historical Society